Denise Perrier (born February 13, 1935) is a French actress, former model and beauty queen who won Miss World 1953. She now goes by "Denise Perrier Lanfranchi." She is still the only French woman to have won the Miss World title.

Biography
Denise Perrier was born and grew up in the French town Ambérieu-en-Bugey. Her father was a gendarme. Her family moved to French Indochina and returned to France before the 1954 Geneva Conference. When she was 18 years old, the director of the casino of Saint-Raphaël invited her to compete in the Miss Saint-Raphaël beauty pageant contest that was taking place the same night. She won the contest and moved on to participate to the Miss France contest.

Denise Perrier was crowned Miss France World 1953 by Miss France World 1952, Nicole Drouin. She represented France in the Miss World 1953 pageant. Perrier was the chosen as Miss World during that year's pageant, representing France, the same year that Christiane Martel of France also won the Miss Universe pageant. She was the first French woman to win this title. She met Julia Morley and they became close friends.

Perrier has also acted in films. Her most memorable scene is an uncredited appearance in the 1971 James Bond movie, Diamonds Are Forever. In the scene, after a little persuasion from James Bond, who starts throttling her with the top of her bikini, she gives up and reveals the location of the villain of the film. She said that she asked Sean Connery to go a little rough on the strangling act to make sure she would look attacked, and that he did.

After leaving her modelling career, Perrier became active in local government in her native France. She held three municipal mandates in the list of Jacques Médecin, then the Mayor of Nice.

She was one of the judges at the 2005, 2010, 2011 and 2013 Miss World contests.

Filmography
Toutes folles de lui (1967)
The Blonde from Peking (1967) - La speakerine
Le Bourgeois gentil mec (1969)
Diamonds Are Forever (1971) - Marie (uncredited)

References

External links
 

1935 births
Living people
People from Ambérieu-en-Bugey
French female models
French film actresses
20th-century French actresses
Miss World winners
Miss World 1953 delegates
French beauty pageant winners